Cymbiola cymbiola, common name the crown volute, is a species of sea snail, a marine gastropod mollusk in the family Volutidae, the volutes.

Description
The size of the shell varies between 55 mm and 85 mm.

Distribution
This marine species occurs off Indonesia (Moluccas) and off Australia (Northern Territory, Queensland, Western Australia)

References

 Gmelin J.F. 1791. Caroli a Linné. Systema Naturae per regna tria naturae, secundum classes, ordines, genera, species, cum characteribus, differentiis, synonymis, locis. Lipsiae : Georg. Emanuel. Beer Vermes. Vol. 1(Part 6) pp. 3021–3910.
 Dillwyn, L.W. 1817. A Descriptive Catalogue of Recent Shells, arranged according to the Linnaean method; with particular attention to the synonymy. London : John and Arthur Arch 2 volumes 1092 + 29 pp.
 Wood, W. 1828. Index Testaceologicus; or A Catalogue of Shells, British and Foreign, arranged according to the Linnean system. London : Taylor Supplement, pp. 1–59, pls 1–8.
 Smith, M. 1942. A review of the Volutidae. Winter Park, Florida : Tropical Photographic Laboratory pp. 1–127, pls 1-26, figs 1–185.
 Wenz, W. 1943. Handbuch der Paläozoologie. Gastropoda. Berlin : Gebrüder Borntraeger Vol. 6 pp. 1311–1355, several text figs.
 Weaver, C.S. & du Pont, J.E. 1970. Living Volutes - A Monograph of the Recent Volutidae of the World. Monograph Series No. 1. Greenville Delaware : Delaware Museum of Natural History pp. 1–375. 
 Wilson, B. 1994. Australian Marine Shells. Prosobranch Gastropods. Kallaroo, WA : Odyssey Publishing Vol. 2 370 pp. 
 Bail, P & Poppe, G. T. 2001. A conchological iconography: a taxonomic introduction of the recent Volutidae. Hackenheim-Conchbook, 30 pp, 5 pl.

External links
 

Volutidae
Gastropods described in 1791